This is a list of Indian films that have no songs. Although songs and dance often play an integral part in the majority of Indian films, some films (mostly experimental films) choose to exclude them, mostly to focus on the main story.

List 
 Ab Tak Chhappan
 Adhu
 Agadam
 Agni Devi
 Airport (1993 film)
 Akku (film)
 Aligarh (film)
 Amrutham Gamaya
 Andhagaara
 Anukshanam
 Aparajito
 Aparan (film)
 Apur Panchali
 Ashoka (2008 film)
 Atithi (2002 film)
 Attahasa
 August 1 (film)
 Awe (film)
 Bhagavan (2009 film)
 Bharathchandran I.P.S.
 Bhoot (film)
 Bhoot Returns
 CandyFlip
 Chander Pahar (film)
 Chennaiyil Oru Naal 2
 Chokher Bali (film)
 Chupp
 Commissioner (film)
 Court (film)
 Curfew (1994 film)
 Cyanide (2006 film)
 CzechMate: In Search of Jiří Menzel
 Devaki (2019 film)
 Dollar Dreams
 Dweepa
 Eeb Allay Ooo!
 Ek Ruka Hua Faisla
 Ekalavyan (film)
 Elippathayam
 F. I. R. (1999 film)
 Fired (film)
 Frozen (2007 film)
 Gali Guleiyan
 Ghazi (film)
 Harishchandrachi Factory
 Housefull (1999 film)
 Hyderabad Blues
 Idu Saadhya
 Inba Twinkle Lilly
 Irul (film)
 Ittefaq (1969 film)
 Jaane Bhi Do Yaaro
 Jagratha
 Johnny (2018 film)
 Kaatteri
 Kalyug (1981 film)
 Kaun?
 The King & the Commissioner
 The King (1995 film)
 Kithakithalu
 Kodiyettam
 Kolaiyuthir Kaalam
 Kuttrame Thandanai
 London Confidential
 The Lunchbox
 Lust Stories
 Mahabharat Aur Barbareek
 Mardaani 2
 Marupakkam
 Mathilukal (film)
 Mercury (film)
 Mrs. Serial Killer
 Mugam (1999 film)
 Mukham
 Mumbai Meri Jaan
 Mumbai Police (film)
 Naachiyaar
 Nandanavanam 120km
 Nerariyan CBI
 New Delhi Times (film)
 Nishyabda
 Om-Dar-B-Dar
 Omerta (2017 film)
 Onaayum Aattukkuttiyum
 Parched
 Parzania
 Pather Panchali
 Pathram
 Payanam (2011 film)
 Plot No. 5
 Police Story (1996 film)
 Police Story 2 (2007 film)
 Police Story 3 (2011 film)
 Raakh
 Raat (film)
 Rajakeeya Chadarangam
 Riyasat (film)
 Rokkk
 Roudram
 Sandhya Raagam (1989 film)
 Section 375
 Seesa
 Sethurama Iyer CBI
 Shanti (film)
 Shivam (2002 film)
 Shock (2004 film)
 Sins (film)
 Seemabaddha
 Sometimes (film)
 Sound of Boot
 Sthalathe Pradhana Payyans
 Super Deluxe (film)
 Suttu Pidikka Utharavu
 Taskara
 Thalaimuraigal
 Thalastaanam
 Thupparivaalan
 To Let (film)
 The Truth (1998 film)
 Udgharsha
 Uruvam
 Vaigai Express (film)
 Vanna Kanavugal
 Veedu
 Veeram (2016 film)
 Watchman (film)

Songs, none